The Test is a 1935 American Western film directed by Bernard B. Ray and produced by Ray and Harry S. Webb for Reliable Pictures. It features as its hero the dog Rin Tin Tin, Jr.

Plot
Fur trapper Brule Conway sets Rin Tin Tin Jr. to guard his furs. The henchmen of a rival trapper use a female dog to lure Rinty away from his post, and then proceed to steal the stash of furs. Rinty sets out to capture the thieves and return his master's furs.

Cast 
Grant Withers as Brule Conway
Grace Ford as Beth McVey
Monte Blue as Pepite La Joie
Lafe McKee as Dad McVey
Artie Ortego as Henchman Black Wolf
Jimmy Aubrey as Henchman Donovan
Nanette the Dog as Nanette
Rin Tin Tin, Jr. as Rinnie

External links 

1935 films
1935 Western (genre) films
American black-and-white films
American Western (genre) films
Films directed by Bernard B. Ray
Northern (genre) films
Reliable Pictures films
Rin Tin Tin
1930s English-language films
1930s American films